Slavery in Turkey is illegal, though like many other countries, it suffers from issues relating to human trafficking. Historically, slavery in Turkey was significant during the Ottoman Empire period.

History

Slavery was a significant part of the Ottoman Empire's economy.

Modern 
 
Turkey is a top destination for victims of human trafficking, according to a report produced by the UNDOC.  

A 2016 report based on the Global Slavery Index estimated that there may be about "480,000 people in Turkey [who] live like modern slaves" . 

Many members of the Afro-Turk minority are descendants of the former slaves.

See also
History of slavery in the Muslim world
Human rights in Turkey

References

Economic history of Turkey
Legal history of Turkey
Turkey
Slavery in Europe
Slavery in Asia
Human rights abuses in Turkey